Devil's Music is the sixth studio album by Swedish band Teddybears, released on 24 March 2010 on Sony Music. It was released in the United States on 21 June 2011 with a slightly altered track listing, Robyn replacing Maipei as the featured artist on "Cardiac Arrest", and B.o.B replacing Desmond Forster on "Get Mama a House".

Track listing
"Rocket Scientist" (feat. Eve) - 3:07
"Get Mama a House" (feat. Desmond Foster) - 3:22
"Cardiac Arrest" (feat. Mapei) -3:00
"Glow in the Dark" - 3:33
"Get Fresh with You" (feat. Laza Morgan) - 3:14
"Cho Cha" (feat. Cee-Lo Green  & The B-52s) - 3:21
"Crystal Meth Christian" (feat. The Flaming Lips) - 3:44
"Cisum Slived" - 4:19
"Devil's Music" (feat. ADL) - 3:26
"Tek It Down" (feat. Rigo) - 3:05
"Wolfman" - 4:17
"Bukowski" - 0:22

Charts

References

External links 
 Devil's Music at Discogs
 Devil's Music at Metacritic

2010 albums
Teddybears (band) albums
Sony Music albums